"¿Y Quién Puede Ser?" ("Who Could it Be?") is a song written and produced by Paco Cepero, co-written by F.M. Moncada, and performed by Mexican singer José José. It was released in 1986 as the first single from his 22nd studio album Siempre Contigo (1986). It peaked at number-one in the Billboard Hot Latin Tracks chart on November 22, 1986, being the fourth song to do so, replacing "Toda La Vida" by Cuban performer Franco. This song has been covered by Grupo Mojado, Manuel, Trailer de Penita and Sabrosos del Merengue. As part of the Latin Grammy tribute to José José in 2008, Puerto Rican singer Olga Tañón performed the song live in merengue.

Chart performance

References

1986 singles
1986 songs
José José songs
Spanish-language songs
RCA Records singles